Homevale High School is situated in Kimberley, Northern Cape, South Africa, in a location known as extension. The school is multi-racial and it is a government school. The school has close to 1000 learners.

Schools in the Northern Cape
High schools in South Africa